The Men's recurve team event at the 2010 South American Games had its qualification during the individual qualification on March 21, and the finals on March 24.

Medalists

Results

Qualification

Draw

Final match details

References
Qualification
Draw
Final

Team Recurve Men